Rao Bahadur "Dharmapravartha" Gubbi Thotadappa (Kannada: ರಾವ್ ಬಹದ್ದೂರ್ ಧರ್ಮಪ್ರವರ್ತ ಗುಬ್ಬಿ ತೋಟದಪ್ಪ), (1838-1910 Gubbi), was an Indian businessman and philanthropist. He founded a free lodging place for tourists from across the nation called "Thotadappa Chathra". He was honoured with the title "Dharmapravartha" by the Maharaja of Mysore, Krishnaraja Wodeyar IV and "Rao Bahadur" by the British government.

Early years
Thotadappa was born in 1838 in a Lingayat family of Gubbi. His family moved to Bangalore in the later years where he started his business in Mamulpet.

Social work

Having no children of his own, Thotadappa decided to use all his property to the benefit of tourists and students. He founded a trust called Rao Bahadur Dharmapravartha Gubbi Thotadappa Charities (RBDGTC). In 1897, the trust bought a piece of land near Bangalore City Railway Station and, on 11 Feb 1903, Krishnaraja Wodeyar IV officially opened the Dharmachathra (for visiting tourists) and Free Hostel (for students). During his last days he donated all his property to RBDGTC trust and appointed K. P. Puttanna Chetty as first president of that trust. The trust continues its work today. This hostel facility was extended to all over Karnataka. In the year 2005, the hostel was reconstructed. For its centenary the trust built Bell Hotel at Kempegowda Bus Station as a source of income. The lodging facility offers accommodation at a nominal rate and is open to all, irrespective of their religion. Use of the hostel, however, is exclusive to students belonging to the lingayat community. To date the hostel has not received Government grants. The trust awards scholarships for merit to Lingayat students every year.

Honours
 In 1905, he was given the title "Dharmapravartha" by the Maharaja of Mysore, Krishnaraja Wodeyar IV, for his social services.
 In 1910, George V, Emperor of India, granted him the nobility of "Rao Bahadur".

Death
On 21 February 1910, Thotadappa died at the age of 72.

Influence
Dr. Sree Sree Sree Shivakumara Swamiji was a student of Thotadappa hostel during the years 1927-1930.
S. Nijalingappa, Karnataka's Fourth Chief Minister, was a student of Thotadappa hostel during the years 1921-1924.
The Road in front of Bangalore City Railway Station was named "Gubbi Thotadappa road" in his honour.

See also 
 K. P. Puttanna Chetty
 Yele Mallappa Shetty
 Sajjan Rao
 S. Ramaswami Mudaliar
 Janopakari Doddanna Setty

References

External links

1838 births
1910 deaths
Businesspeople from Karnataka
Rai Bahadurs
People from Tumkur district
19th-century Indian businesspeople
20th-century Indian businesspeople
19th-century Indian philanthropists
Indian philanthropists